Dendronotus frondosus, sometimes known by the common name frond eolis or bushy backed nudibranch, is a species of sea slug, specifically a dendronotid nudibranch, a marine gastropod mollusc in the family Dendronotidae.

Distribution
This species was described from Norway. A specimen from Norway has been designated as a neotype. This species has been reported from the north-east and north-west Atlantic Ocean. Records from the Pacific Ocean are now known to be distinct species.

Description
The size of the body attains 100 mm.

References

External links
 
 

Dendronotidae
Gastropods described in 1774
Taxa named by Peter Ascanius